Calothamnus  is a genus of shrubs in the family Myrtaceae and is endemic to the south-west of Western Australia. The common names one-sided bottlebrush or claw flower are given to some species due to their having the flowers clustered on one side of the stem or because of the claw-like appearance of their flowers. Calothamnus species are generally medium to tall woody shrubs with crowded leaves. In most species the leaves are crowded and linear in shape, and the flowers are usually arranged in dense clusters. The petals are small and fall off the flower soon after it opens but the stamens are long, numerous and usually bright red.

Description
Plants in the genus Calothamnus are medium to tall shrubs, sometimes low-growing ground covers. The leaves are linear or narrow lance-shaped with the narrower end towards the base, usually glabrous and have distinct oil glands. The flowers are in small groups or dense spikes on leafless, older stems or between the leaves on younger ones. The sepals are fused to form a bell-shaped cup which is often immersed in the branch and there are four or five petals which usually fall off after the flower has opened. There are many stamens, joined for a large proportion of their length into four or five "claws". In some species the upper two claws are fused together and the lower ones are shorter. The stamens are brightly coloured, crimson to a deep purple or rarely yellow. The fruit is a woody capsule.

Taxonomy and naming
The first species in the genus to be described was Calothamnus sanguineus. It was first formally described in 1806 by the French biologist Jacques Labillardière in Novae Hollandiae Plantarum Specimen, Volume 2. The name Calothamnus is derived from the Greek words kalos meaning "beautiful" and thamnos meaning "a shrub" or "a bush".

In 2014, Lyndley Craven and others proposed, mainly on the basis of DNA evidence, that species in the genus Calothamnus, along with those in Beaufortia, Conothamnus, Eremaea, Lamarchea, Petraeomyrtus, Phymatocarpus and Regelia be transferred to Melaleuca.

Distribution and habitat
All Calothamnus species are found in the south west botanical province of Western Australia. Some (such as Calothamnus aridus) are adapted to a dry environment whilst others (such as Calothamnus hirsutus) are often found near swamps.

Use in horticulture
Most species of Calothamnus have been grown in gardens but need full sun and good drainage. Propagation is usually from seeds which are retained in the hard fruits throughout the life of the plant but cuttings can be used to retain the colour of yellow forms.

Species list
The following is a list of species recognised by the Western Australian Herbarium:

Calothamnus accedens  Hawkeswood 
Calothamnus affinis  Turcz.  
Calothamnus arcuatus  A.S.George 
Calothamnus aridus  Hawkeswood  
Calothamnus blepharospermus  F.Muell.  
Calothamnus borealis  Hawkeswood  
Calothamnus brevifolius  Hawkeswood  
Calothamnus chrysanthereus  F.Muell.   - Claw flower
Calothamnus cupularis  A.S.George 
Calothamnus formosus  Hawkeswood  
Calothamnus gibbosus  Benth.  
Calothamnus gilesii  F.Muell.  
Calothamnus glaber  (Benth.) A.S.George 
Calothamnus gracilis  R.Br.  
Calothamnus graniticus  Hawkeswood  
Calothamnus hirsutus  Hawkeswood  
Calothamnus huegelii  Schauer  
Calothamnus lateralis  Lindl.  
Calothamnus lehmannii  Schauer   
Calothamnus longissimus  F.Muell.  
Calothamnus macrocarpus  Hawkeswood Calothamnus microcarpus  F.Muell. Calothamnus montanus  A.S.George Calothamnus oldfieldii  F.Muell. Calothamnus pachystachyus  Benth. Calothamnus phellosus  A.S.George Calothamnus pinifolius  F.Muell.  - Dense claw-flowerCalothamnus planifolius  Lehm. Calothamnus preissii  Schauer  Calothamnus quadrifidus  R.Br.  - One-sided bottlebrushCalothamnus robustus  Schauer  Calothamnus roseus  A.S.George Calothamnus rupestris  Schauer  - Mouse earsCalothamnus sanguineus  Labill.  - Silky-leaved blood-flowerCalothamnus scabridus  A.S.George Calothamnus schaueri  Lehm.   Calothamnus superbus  Hawkeswood & Mollemans Calothamnus torulosus  Schauer Calothamnus tuberosus  Hawkeswood Calothamnus validus  S.Moore  - Barrens claw-flowerCalothamnus villosus''  R.Br.

References

 
Myrtaceae genera
Myrtales of Australia
Rosids of Western Australia
Taxa named by Jacques Labillardière
Endemic flora of Southwest Australia